The S12 is a railway service of the St. Gallen S-Bahn that provides half-hourly service between  and  over the southern end of the Chur–Rorschach line. THURBO, a joint venture of Swiss Federal Railways and the canton of Thurgau, operates the service.

Operations 
In Sargans, an hourly connection is made with the S4, which operates in a circular fashion west over the Ziegelbrücke–Sargans line and north up the Chur–Rorschach line. The S12 is supplemented by various long-distance trains.

Route 

  – 

 Sargans
 
 
 
 Chur

History 
Prior to the December 2013 timetable change, the S12 designation was used for services on the narrow-gauge St. Gallen–Trogen line of Appenzell Railways. That service was renamed S21, while S12 was applied to services running between Sargans and Chur.

References

External links 

 Fahrplan Ost

St. Gallen S-Bahn lines
Transport in the canton of St. Gallen
Transport in Graubünden